Pseudobombax septenatum is of the family Malvaceae, commonly known as Algodón de río, beldaco, ceibo barrigón, majagua colorada or barrigon. It is found from Nicaragua to Brazil. Its flowers are cream-colored and like those of Ceiba spp., in forming a roundish cluster of stamens on a stalk surrounding the pistel, in this instance up to one thousand stamens in number. The leaves generally have seven smooth-edged narrowly oblong leaflets. It was originally named Pachira barrigon, and later Bombax barrigon. It has the bright green lines running through the bark that is also seen in Ceiba spp. and Chorissa spp.

It was first described in 1760 by the Dutch scientist Nikolaus Joseph von Jacquin as Bombax septenatum.  The current name is from Armando Dugand in 1943.

References

Flora of Nicaragua
Flora of Brazil
septenatum
Flora of Bolivia
Flora of Colombia
Flora of Costa Rica
Flora of El Salvador
Flora of Panama
Flora of Peru
Flora of Venezuela
Plants described in 1943
Taxa named by Nikolaus Joseph von Jacquin